Louise Yvonne Faulkner (born 7 April 1937) and Charmian Christabel Alexis Faulkner (born 30 October 1977) were a mother and daughter who went missing from  St Kilda, Victoria, Australia, in 1980. , no-one has been charged over the disappearance and no bodies have been found.

Background 
Louise Faulkner was born on 7 April 1937, in Colac, Victoria, and was the youngest of three children. Her daughter Charmian was born on 30 October 1977.

Last confirmed sighting 
Whilst residing at Acland St, St. Kilda, Louise Faulkner developed a friendship with Corrine Wylde, a neighbour in the same block of flats. On 25 April 1980, Anzac Day in Australia, Louise and Charmian attended a first birthday party for Wylde's son. Faulkner told Wylde that she was going to visit her boyfriend in Gippsland. The following day, Wylde saw the two Faulkners get into a white ute with an older man. This was the last confirmed sighting of either of them. Louise Faulkner was aged 43 and Charmian was two at the time of their disappearance. The only suspect was her lover 60 year old George Sutherland whom Louise Faulkner named as Charmian's father.

Police investigation 
On 9 June 1980, preliminary investigations of the disappearances began. Inquiries were conducted over the following 12 months with friends and associates of Louise.

Coronial inquest 
In August 2006, a coronial inquest was held into the disappearance and death of Louise and Charmian Faulkner and found that the pair were probably murdered. The inquest was re-convened in 2008. On that occasion the coroner ruled the deaths foul play, but said there was not enough evidence to link anyone to the killings.

See also
 Cold case
 Crime in Melbourne
 List of people who disappeared

References

1980 in Australia
1980s missing person cases
April 1980 events in Australia
Crime in Victoria (Australia)
History of Victoria (Australia)
Missing Australian children
Missing people
Missing person cases in Australia
St Kilda, Victoria